Nwoya is a town in Nwoya District in the Acholi sub-region, in the Northern Region of Uganda. It is the main municipal, administrative, and commercial centre of the district. Nwoya Town Council is classified as a municipality.

Location

The coordinates of the town are 2°38'06.0"N, 32°00'00.0"E (Latitude:2.6350; Longitude:32.0000).

Population
As of September 2021, the population, within a  radius of the town centre of Nwoya Municipality is estimated at 4,295 inhabitants.

Overview
Several points of interest lie within the town limits or close to the edges of the town, including the following: (a) the headquarters of Nwoya District Administration (b) the offices of Nwoya Town Council (c) Nwoya central market, the source of daily fresh produce and (d) the Acholibur–Gulu–Olwiyo Road, arriving into town from Gulu in a north-south direction and leaves towards Olwiyo in a northeast-southwest direction.

Challenges
Nwoya Town faces many challenges, including: (1) inadequate garbage collection and disposal (2) insufficient of public toilets downtown (3) inability to restrict roaming of domestic cows, goats, sheep, chicken and ducks (4) inadequate water supply (5) lack of public street lighting (6) inadequate security at night (7) lack of public municipal drainage (8) poor road network and (9) noise pollution.

See also
Acholi people
List of cities and towns in Uganda
List of roads in Uganda

References

External links
Nwoya District Local Government 
National Population and Housing Census 2014: Area Specific Profiles: Nwoya District at ubos.org

Nwoya District
Populated places in Northern Region, Uganda
Cities in the Great Rift Valley